Sergey Andreyevich Kruglov (also Sergei Kruglov, ; born 27 March 1985 in Khabarovsk) is a Russian sport shooter. In 2010, Kruglov had won a gold medal for the 10 m air rifle at the European Shooting Championships in Meråker, Norway, and eventually captured the bronze at the ISSF World Cup in Fort Benning, Georgia, United States. He is also a member of CSA Pomoriye and is coached and trained by Oleg Seleznev.

Kruglov represented Russia at the 2008 Summer Olympics in Beijing, where he competed in the men's 10 m air rifle, along with his teammate Konstantin Prikhodtchenko. He finished only in eighth place by seven tenths of a point (0.7) behind Serbia's Stevan Pletikosić, for a total score of 697 targets (595 in the preliminary rounds and 102 in the final).

In 2013 Sergey started working for the Russian National Team, doubling his efforts as a competitive shooter.

References

External links
NBC 2008 Olympics profile

Russian male sport shooters
Living people
Olympic shooters of Russia
Shooters at the 2008 Summer Olympics
Sportspeople from Khabarovsk
1985 births
Shooters at the 2015 European Games
European Games bronze medalists for Russia
European Games medalists in shooting
Universiade medalists in shooting
Universiade silver medalists for Russia
Medalists at the 2013 Summer Universiade
21st-century Russian people